

References

M